Chiranjiva Shambhusinghji Rao Sahib (died 1891) was the adopted son of Vijaya Mohana Muktamba Bai, the daughter of the last Maratha ruler of Tanjore, Shivaji of Thanjavur. He was the head of the Bhonsle royal family from 1885 when his adoptive mother died till 1891. However, being an adopted son of the Rani, his titles were not recognised by the Government of India and he remained a pretender until his death.

References 
 

1891 deaths
Pretenders
History of Tamil Nadu
Year of birth unknown